Basamadi is a part of Hetauda in Makwanpur District in the Narayani Zone of southern Nepal. At the time of the 1991 Nepal census it had a population of 10,232 people living in 1815 individual households.

Description
Basamadi is located at about seven kilometers from Hetauda city. The name originates from the temple of basaha mahadeva. It is mostly recognisable by the multinational company Unilever which has a branch here. The Mahendra Highway runs through Basamadi.

Basamadi is composed of various types of people including brahmins, magar, chhetri, rai etc. The hilly sides are mostly populated by rai, tamang people.

Education
these schools are situated here

1.Shree Mahendra kiran Higher Secondary school

2. Shiksha Bikas Shishu Sadan

3. Sunshine English boarding school

References

Populated places in Makwanpur District